Lake Brittany is a small lake in the Bella Vista area in Benton County in Northwest Arkansas. The dam is off Trafalgar Road.

References

Bodies of water of Benton County, Arkansas
Brittany
Bella Vista, Arkansas